Daxing is a town under the administration of Yongshan County, Yunnan, China. , it has three residential communities and seven villages under its administration.

References 

Township-level divisions of Zhaotong
Yongshan County